The 2022 Valorant Champions Tour (VCT): Stage 1 Masters, also known as the Valorant Masters Reykjavík 2022, was an international tournament organized by Riot Games for the first-person shooter game Valorant, as part of the Valorant Champions Tour's 2022 competitive season. The tournament ran from April 10–24, 2022, in Reykjavík, Iceland. The city also previously hosted the 2021 VCT Stage 2 Masters.

Venue 
Reykjavík was the city chosen to host the competition. All matches were played at Laugardalshöll without spectators.

Format

Tournament spots 
The champion teams from the Asia-Pacific; EMEA (Europe, the Middle East and Africa) and North America Stage 1 Challengers were all directly qualified to the upper bracket quarterfinals. Which of the two regions Latin America and Brazil win the South America Playoff (the match between two runner-up teams from Challengers of twos) will get quarterfinals spot for their Challengers winner. The remaining eight teams were seeded in the GSL formatted group stage and were divided into two groups of four teams.

This tournament has 12 spots which are divided below:

Qualified teams 
FunPlus Phoenix originally qualified for the Stage 1 Masters after winning the 2022 EMEA Stage 1 Challengers; however, due to the travel restrictions caused by the Russia-Ukraine conflict, they were not able to field a team and were forced to withdraw from the competition. Riot then decided to replace them with Team Liquid as EMEA's third representative. With this, the squad was still awarded $25,000 and 200 circuit points, which is equivalent to an eighth-place finish — the lowest place they could have earned at the tournament.

Brazil's Challengers runner-up Ninjas in Pyjamas had won Latin America's Challengers runner-up Leviatán in South America Playoff match, leading to South America's spot in Knockout stage was given to Brazil's Challengers winner LOUD instead of Latin America's Challengers winner KRÜ Esports.

Map pool 
List of 7 maps are played in this tournament:

 Ascent
 Bind
 Breeze
 Fracture
 Haven
 Icebox
 Split

Group stage 

 8 teams are divided into 2 groups of four teams each playing in a GSL-style double-elimination format. Two teams from the EMEA could not be placed in the same group.
 Games are held in a Bo3 series.
 2 teams in each group will qualify for the playoffs.

Group A

Group B

Knockout stage 
 4 seeded teams and 4 teams who qualified for the playoffs will play in a double-elimination tournament.
 All matches are a  series, except for the Lower Bracket Final and the Grand Final, which are a  series.
 The seeded team is drawn against the qualified team from groups.
 Teams from same group will be on opposite sides of the Upper Bracket, meaning they cannot play each other until the Upper Bracket Finals (if both not go down to Lower Bracket).
 Teams from same side in Upper Bracket will be on opposite sides of the Loser Bracket if both go down, meaning they cannot play each other until the Loser Bracket Semifinals.

Final rankings 

Source:

Notes

References

External links 

2022 in esports
2022 first-person shooter tournaments
Valorant competitions